Olga Prokhorova (born 19 March 1979 in Moscow) is a Russian retired swimmer. She won a bronze medal at the 1994 World Aquatics Championships.

References

External links
Profile at TheSports.org
Profile at Infosport.ru 

1979 births
Living people
Swimmers from Moscow
Russian female swimmers
World Aquatics Championships medalists in swimming